The  is a series of high-performance hatchback/sedan models based on the Civic, developed and produced by Honda since September 1997. The first Civic Type R was the third model to receive Honda's Type R badge (after the NSX and Integra). Type R versions of the Civic typically feature a lightened and stiffened body, specially tuned engine, and upgraded brakes and chassis, and are offered only in five- or six-speed manual transmission. Like other Type R models, red is used in the background of the Honda badge to give it a special sporting distinction and to separate it from other models.



EK9 (1997; based on sixth generation Civic) 

The first Civic to receive the 'Type R' nameplate was based on the 6th-generation of the fan-base 'EK' Civic. The contributing base model was the JDM Civic 3-door hatchback called the SiR (code-named EK4). Like its sibling, the Integra Type R DC2/JDM DB8, the Civic SiR's transformation into a Type R was achieved by working on the base model and improving it to Honda's idea of a car capable of high performance on the circuit.

The first Civic to receive the Type R badge was introduced on August 19, 1997, as the EK9. The EK9 shared many characteristics with the Integra Type R DC2/JDM DB8 such as omission of sound deadening and other weight reduction measures, a hand-ported B16B engine, front helical limited-slip differential and a close-ratio transmission. For the first time, a strategically seam-welded monocoque chassis was used to improve chassis rigidity. The interior featured red Recaro bucket seats, red door cards, red Type R floor mats, a titanium shift knob, and a Momo leather-wrapped steering wheel. The EK9 was only available for sale in Japan.

Performance figures include a  acceleration time of 6.7 seconds and a quarter-mile time of 15.3 seconds.

In 1998, the Civic Type R Motor Sports edition was introduced. It came with steel wheels, the standard grey EK interior, manual windows, no a/c and without any other creature comforts.

Facelift 
The Type Rx model introduced in 1999 was given a CD player, body-colored retractable electric door mirrors, power windows, auto air conditioning, keyless entry unlock system, aluminium sports pedals, and a carbon type centre panel. The Type Rx was the final model of the EK9 generation. Production of the EK9 Civic Type R totalled 16,000 units.

In 1999, Honda tuning company Spoon Sports designed an N1 racing version of the Type R that had the B16B engine redline increased from 8,400 rpm to 11,000 rpm.

EP3 (2001; based on seventh generation Civic) 

In 2001, Honda introduced the next generation of the Civic Type R as a unique 3-door hatchback to the UK market, which was manufactured in Swindon, England. This European Domestic Market Civic Type R featured a  2.0-liter i-VTEC engine (K20A2) and the regular Type R treatment of seam welding, close ratio 6-speed transmission and upgraded brakes, but did not include some of the other higher-end features such as the helical LSD and red Recaro race seats that were standard on the EK9.

However, Honda marketed a JDM (Japanese domestic market) version of the EP3 (which was exclusively manufactured in Swindon, UK and was shipped to Japan), which retained the highly renowned helical LSD similar to that of the EK9 and red Recaro race seats. All of the Japan-spec K20A Type R powertrains were built in Japan and shipped to the Swindon plant to be installed in the Japan-spec Type R EP3. The JDM EP3 was also available in the traditional Type R Championship White while the EDM was not. The EDM has more relaxed gear ratios and some high rpm torque traded for low rpm torque compared to the JDM.

In 2003, the EP3 was updated with many improvements – revised EPS with quicker steering, revised suspension settings, projector headlamps (JDM came equipped with halogens only while the EDM came with an option for HIDs with self-leveling motors), lighter clutch and flywheel assembly, etc. Based on Honda literature, this facelifted (FL) model was targeted at addressing customers' and critics' feedback such as understeer on the limit (due to the front MacPherson strut setup), numb steering response and lack of low-end torque.

Performance (all figures are manufacturer claims)

0– in 5.8/6.5 seconds (JDM/EDM Pre-facelift), 5.8/6.4 seconds (JDM/EDM Facelift)
 0– in 15.1/16 secs (JDM/EDM Facelift)

Note: JDM (Japanese Domestic Model), EDM (European Domestic Model).

Mugen Motorsports developed an upgraded version of the JDM Civic Type R, with a sport exhaust system and engine tuning, special Mugen Grille, and anti-roll bars for pro racing activities.

A total of 25,798 units were built for Europe and Japan. Europe received 24,334 units and Japan received 1,464 units.

30th Anniversary Edition
In 2003, Honda celebrated 30 years of the Civic badge by offering a special edition 30th Anniversary Civic Type R. This special edition featured red bucket seats from Recaro, air conditioning, privacy glass on the rear windows, a leather MOMO steering wheel, red interior carpet and door cards. The 30th Anniversary models in the UK were available in Nighthawk Black, Satin Silver and Milano Red. Only 300 of these models were produced, 100 in each color.

Premier Edition
In 2005, towards the end of the EP3's production run, Honda introduced the Civic Type R Premier edition which had Recaro Trendline seats (similar to those found in the Anniversary Edition, only in red and black rather than all red), a darker shade of fabric on the rear seat centre sections, a MOMO steering wheel, red carpet, door linings, "Type R" embossed into the front brake calipers and black privacy glass on the rear windows. Air conditioning was an option. They were available in Milano Red, Nighthawk Black, Cosmic Grey and Satin Silver.

C Package
In 2004, Honda introduced the "C Package" option (¥330,000 JPY) to Japan's Civic Type R lineup which included an additional color, Satin Silver Metallic, HID lighting, rear privacy glass, automatic air conditioner and outside air temperature sensor.

Last year of production 
For the last production year (2005), the EP3 Type R was offered in Vivid Blue Pearl for the European market. A total of 132 EP3s, which were all left-hand drive, were produced in Vivid Blue Pearl.

The 2005 Vivid Blue Pearl EP3 is often mistaken for a Premier Edition, which it is not. They were sold with the standard, facelifted Type R interior, although they had other variations, which were not to be found on the right-hand driven EP3s sold for the UK market.

All 132 Vivid Blue Pearl EP3s were delivered with xenon headlights, which includes integrated headlight washer jets in the front bumpers, as well as a height sensor in the right rear wheel arch, which will automatically adjust the height of the light beam as per required by EU regulations.

It is also fitted with rear privacy glass and outside air temperature sensor, as well as the EUDM center console with mechanical knobs placed over the radio unit, as opposed to the UKDM, USDM and JDM models with electronic knobs fitted on the side of the radio unit.

Sales figures

FD2/FN2 (2007; based on eighth generation Civic) 
The third generation of the Civic Type R was offered in two distinct models: one developed for the Japanese domestic market and the other for UK and international markets each matching the availability of their regular 8th generation counterparts.

FD2 (Japanese version)

The Japanese market Civic Type R (FD2) went on sale on 30 March 2007. For the first time, the JDM Civic Type R was sold as a four-door sedan, rather than a three-door hatchback. Power is sent to the front wheels through a close-ratio six-speed manual transmission, and a helical limited slip differential is fitted as standard. The front brake discs are  diameter and fitted with four piston Brembo calipers. The car is fitted with Bridgestone Potenza RE070 tires having a size of 225/40 R18.

Honda claims the chassis is 50% more rigid than the previous Japan-only pre-facelift DC5 Integra Type R and 25% more rigid than the previous Japan-only facelift DC5 Integra Type R. The FD2 features an independent rear suspension rather than the torsion beam configuration used on the FN2 Type-R. To save weight, aluminium is used extensively and bonded with adhesive instead of welded. Though the chassis is larger and more rigid than the JDM Integra Type R, it is only  heavier.

Exterior wise, the front bumper is wider and different from the standard Civic designed aerodynamically. The rear bumper features a diffuser built into the bumper and a large rear wing completes the aero package. Inside, the trademark black and red bucket seats are no longer made by Recaro as with previous versions but designed in-house by Honda. Also gone is the Momo made steering wheel, instead replaced by a Honda made version. The familiar red-on-black color scheme or black-on-black scheme is offered on Championship White and Super Platinum Metallic Silver while a black-on-black scheme with red stitching is for the Vivid Blue Pearl model only.

In October 2008, the Type R received new colors, those being Premium White Pearl, Premium Deep Violet Pearl and Crystal Black Pearl. The Vivid Blue Pearl color was dropped.

In back to back tests, the Civic Type R (FD2) was on average 1 second quicker than the Integra Type-R (DC5) at the Tsukuba Circuit and four seconds faster at the longer Suzuka Circuit.

In a back-to-back test on the United Kingdom TV program Fifth Gear, the FD2 Type-R was three seconds quicker than the equivalent FN2 UK version around Castle Combe Circuit in wet conditions. However, the FN2 managed a 13.1 second quarter mile pass at Killarney Raceway.

A total of 14,062 FD2 Civic Type R units were produced until it ceased production in August 2010 due to failure to meet the upcoming emission requirements. Following the previous success due to the introduction of the FN2 Civic Type R from Europe in 2009, another batch of FN2 Type R with minor updates was available in Japan from fall 2010. However, the engine was the same K20Z4 straight-4 as used in the European version.

Civic Mugen RR (ABA-FD2)

In addition to Civic Type R, 300 units of Honda Civic Mugen RR cars available exclusively in Milano Red had also been produced for Japanese market, which reduced weight to  using carbon fiber bumpers and aluminum for the hood. Other exclusive items include Recaro SP-X racing bucket seats and other Mugen items on the interior while special 18 inch Mugen 7-spoke wheels come equipped as standard. It went on sale in Japan on 13 September 2007.

Weight is further reduced using an aluminium hood, as well as a new titanium exhaust system. The interior was also updated with more carbon fiber parts. The car also features Intelligent-Tire Condition Monitoring System (i-TCMS) and Recaro seats.

The Honda Civic Mugen RR Advanced Concept was debuted at the 2009 Tokyo Auto Salon, based on the face-lifted FD2.

Civic Mugen RC (2008)

A race version called Honda Civic Mugen RC was developed by Mugen for the 2008 Honda Exciting Cup Civic One-Make Race-Civic Series. The engine is the stock K20A engine from FD2 Honda Civic Type R. It came in the following models with the following prices:
 Basic:  (5,950,000+tax).
 Standard:  (6,850,000+tax). It adds a racing wheel package (Mugen RC 18-inch wheel with Yokohama tire), brake package (front and rear brake pads), seat and steering (Recaro bucket seat, seat rail, steering wheel with box, TAKATA harness), carbon inner part option A (carbon fiber right floor cover panel, footrest, door lining).
 Complete:  (7,450,000+tax). It adds carbon inner part option B (carbon-fiber console box, left floor cover panel, centre pillar cover), engine package (engine rebalancing and calibration).

The Civic Mugen RC was built in Mugen's M-TEC factory.

FN2 (European and international version)

The European and international market Civic Type R is offered only as a three-door hatchback and uses a different chassis and internal layout (notably tank placement below the driver's seat), which will serve as the base for the next European version of the Jazz. The rear suspension, formerly a double wishbone setup, was changed to a less complex torsion beam axle. The car is fitted with 225/40 R18 Y88 Bridgestone Potenza RE050A tires, while optional 19-inch Rage alloys fitted with Yokohama Advan Sport 225/35 ZR19 88Y tires were also available. A total of 29,039 Type-R specification FN2 models were built at the Honda factory in Swindon, 13,514 RHD for the UK, 8,378 LHD for Europe, 3,510 for Japan, 2,285 for Australia, with the remaining units heading to Africa & Asia regions.

Trims
Type R GT From introduction in 2007, The Type R GT trim includes dual-zone climate control (Left:right independent), rain-sensing windscreen wipers, refrigerated glove box, automatic headlights with dusk sensor, front fog lights, power-folding wing mirrors, cruise control, front and rear curtain airbags. In the UK market from 2009 model year, GT models also gained HID headlights with auto levelling, headlight washers with switch, USB and AUX connectors located in the arm rest storage area as well as a multi LED high level rear brake light to replace the previous design. An LSD was fitted to all GT models from April 2010 production also (this was never made available on base Type R models)

FN2 Type R's were finished in the same four colors as the standard FN2, and a new color called Deep Sapphire Blue Pearl added to the colors offered from 2010, at the same time Deep Bronze Metallic was dropped. Only 226 examples of the Deep Sapphire Blue Pearl were built in Type-R specification, 114 for the UK and 112 for Europe. 

In 2009, the Championship White Edition Type R was made available and added a Helical LSD to the Type R GT feature roster as well as trim items such as dark tint front grill and fuel filler cap as well as color-matched white wheels.

Type R HeritageAs often, names and trims vary even within domain markets down to local ones, and a Heritage trim replaces the GT version in some of them, adding Xenon/HID lights to the mix. The Heritage's infotainment system version adds Bluetooth telephone system and voice recognition DVD satellite navigation. This model was not offered in the UK.

Type R RaceA more radical trim dubbed Race differs from the Heritage by removing components (incl.

Type R (Aust)The Type R (Australasia) trim includes dual-zone climate control (Left:right independent), rain-sensing windscreen wipers, refrigerated glove box, front fog lights, power-folding wing mirrors, cruise control, CD/radio/apple integration, front and rear curtain airbags. It is finished in the same four colors as the Euro standard FN2.

Production for the European market ended in October 2010 due to the engine not meeting Euro V emissions regulations which came into effect in 2011. Over 12,000 Civic Type Rs were sold in the UK since January 2007, Honda continued to export the car to the Australian market into 2011. It was also exported to Japan and marketed as Civic Type-R EURO in a limited edition in fall 2010, following a successful run in November 2009.

Reception
Top Gear Magazine awarded the European Civic Type R its 'Hot Hatch of 2007', praising the car's controls and comparing it favorably as a driver's car to its rivals, the Stig qualifying it as 'an utter gem'. However the television show Top Gear later criticized the new FN2 Chassis version, due to the different suspension and added weight. Jeremy Clarkson said it "just doesn't feel that quick" and that "all the poise and controllability that you used to get in the old car is just sort of... gone".

Markets
AustraliaThe FN2 Civic Type R was available in Australia from mid-2007 until 2011.

SingaporeIn Singapore, the FN2 Civic Type R Hatchback (European version) was sold by authorized dealer, while the FD2 sedan was sold through parallel importers.

MalaysiaThe FD2 Civic Type R was officially launched in the Malaysian market in August 2007. It was the first time Honda launched a Type R JDM outside of Japan.

JapanThe FD2 sedan was initially the only model available in Japan, but as of November 2009, Honda imported the European FN2 hatchback in limited numbers of about 2,010 units, giving it the name Civic Type R EURO. A second batch of 1,500 was imported back to Japan in 2010, with the color Crystal Black Pearl added.

FK2 (2015; based on ninth generation Civic) 

In September 2012, there were rumors about the confirmation of the next-generation of the Honda Civic Type R at the Paris Motor Show. A preview took place at the Geneva Motor Show in March 2014.

Production

In January 2015, Honda announced that the production-ready model of the fourth generation of the Civic Type R (called the FK2) would debut at the 85th Geneva Motor Show held in March alongside the European debut of the NSX. It is the first factory turbocharged Civic Type R.

Performance 
The engine is mated to a 6-speed manual transmission with a factory equipped plate-style limited-slip differential. Honda claimed that the Type R can accelerate from 0– in 5.7 seconds. The engine is manufactured at Honda's Anna Engine Plant in Ohio before being exported to the UK.

Combined CO2 emission is 170g/km and the car has achieved Euro 6 Emission Standard.

Safety
The Civic Type R is equipped with dual front airbags, front side airbags and front and rear side curtain airbags. Larger brakes are fitted for improved stopping power with front brakes having  ventilated and drilled discs and rear brakes having  solid discs. The anti-lock braking system, electronic brake-force distribution, hill start assist, and vehicle stability assist are standard.

Special Editions

Mugen Type R concept 

Introduced at the 2016 Tokyo Motor Show, the Mugen Civic Type R is an aerodynamic package for the Civic Type R. The package includes an adjustable front lip spoiler, front canards, side skirts and a rear diffuser. The rear wing has been replaced with a GT style fixed rear wing. These elements are made from carbon fiber, a carbon fiber hood was also included as an option. There were no changes made to the drivetrain although a new exhaust system having a single exhaust pipe instead of the quad was fitted.

Special Editions 

The Black Edition marked the end of the production of the FK2 Civic Type R. Based on the GT Trim Type R, notable features include black exterior paint with red accents, black interior with red stitching and red brake calipers. Production was limited to 100 units in UK.

In other countries of Europe a White Edition was also released, still based on the GT Trim Type R, similar to the Black Edition but with white accents.

Regions

United Kingdom
Although they both were priced differently, differences are limited to additional equipment and amenities. Key specifications related to power figures remain the same for both variants.

Japan
In July 2015, Swindon, England (HUM) started exporting the FK2 Civic Type R to Japan, making it the third Civic Type R to be exported there. However, only 750 units were exported.

FK8 (2017; based on tenth generation Civic)  

The Civic Type R Prototype was unveiled in September 2016 at the Paris Motor Show, and the production version unveiled at the 2017 Geneva Motor Show. The new car builds on Honda's heritage in developing high-performance hatchbacks.

Exterior 

The design is based on the Civic Hatchback, with a winged carbon fiber effect splitter with red accent line, slatted ducts, diamond-mesh air intakes, red 'H' badge above a new air vent at the nose of the car, new air intake on the hood, an air scoop sited centrally in a trapezoidal recess, smoked lenses for the LED headlights, indicators and side repeaters, carbon fiber effect side skirts, 20-inch piano black alloy wheels with red accents, 245/30 R20 high-performance tires, enlarged wheel arches, a carbon fiber effect diffuser which runs below the wider rear bumper, 3 tailpipes with a pair of directional strakes at each side, central tailpipe in bright metallic red and unique peaks at the roof flanks that point backward.

Engine and other specifications 
The engine is mated to a close-ratio 6-speed manual transmission continuing the tradition of its predecessors with limited-slip differential as standard. The aerodynamic elements increase downforce even further as compared to the outgoing model. The FK8 has a top speed of  making it the fastest Civic Type R model to date.

In back-to-back testing involving an FK8 and FK2 Type R, the reviewers praised the FK8's comfortable ride and feedback and criticised the FK2's harsh ride on the road and worse handling when the R+ driving mode was activated. The reviewers also complained about the FK2's interior being dated but stated that this was due to the model's late arrival at the end of the base model's production run.

Interior and safety features 

The interior of the Type R is based on the base model Civic and has a low driving position with the gear shift lever positioned high in order to allow for easy gear changes. The interior has red and black color as standard with sports seats along with faux carbon fiber trim. The driver's seat and the steering wheel are adjustable. A reversing camera is standard for easier rear visibility while reversing while parking sensors are standard in the GT Trim. The interior although lauded for its comfortability and user-friendliness is criticised for its infotainment system which has been described as slow and difficult to operate. The fit and finish are considered to be comparable with its competitors. Safety features include automatic emergency braking, traffic sign recognition, lane departure warning and automatic high beam assistance which are carried over from the base Civic. The GT trim adds blindspot monitoring and cross-traffic alert, parking sensors at the front and rear, dual-zone climate control, power-folding door mirrors and infotainment upgrades that include wireless phone charging and in-built sat-navigation along with a more powerful 11-speaker stereo. The Type R earned a Euro NCAP 5 star crash test rating.

Records 
On 3 April 2017, the pre-production Type R achieved a lap time of 7:43.80 on the Nürburgring Nordschleife, almost 7 seconds faster than its predecessor, setting a new record for front-wheel drive cars. The car also set new front-wheel drive lap records at the Magny-Cours, Spa-Francorchamps, Silverstone, Estoril, Hungaroring and Mount Panorama circuits. The Nürburgring record was broken by the Renault Mégane RS Trophy-R in July 2019 which set a time of 7:40.10, but in 2020 the Limited Edition Civic Type R broke the Mégane's front-wheel drive lap record at the Suzuka Circuit by one and a half seconds.

Markets

United States 
The Civic Type R went on sale in the United States on 14 June 2017, marking the first time the Civic Type R was officially available to the U.S. market.

Due to emissions reasons it's only offered with 310 PS and the 320 PS model is not offered as it would violate the road vehicle emissions law and therefore be only legal for racing and not road legal.

United Kingdom 
In the UK, the Civic Type R was available for consumer test drives in August 2017, with official delivery and sale dates coinciding with national vehicle registration plate changes on 1 September.

Australia 
The FK8 Civic Type R went on sale in Australia in September 2017. Only one trim level was available about midway between the EDM Touring and GT specifications. Citing lower access to high octane fuels the engine was only offered in the 306 bhp tune. On the road cost without any options was approximately $53,000.

Indonesia 
The Civic Type R was launched in Indonesia during the 25th Gaikindo Indonesia International Auto Show in August 2017. The facelifted model was released in May 2021.

Malaysia and Singapore 
In Singapore, the Civic Type R was officially launched by Kah Motor on 27 July 2017 in limited numbers.

In Malaysia, the Civic Type R was launched in October 2017 during the Malaysia Autoshow with a price of RM320,000.

Thailand 
In Thailand, the Civic Type R was launched in 2018 with a price of ฿ 4,600,000 with only 4 units.

Awards 
The FK8 Civic Type R has won many accolades and awards. It was crowned Top Gear Magazines Hot Hatch of the Year 2017, it was also voted International Editors’ Choice and overall Car of the Year 2017. What Car? also awarded the Type R its Hot Hatch of the Year award. In Australia, the car was awarded Performance Car of the Year 2018. The car was chosen as one of the Top 10 Tech Cars by the IEEE in 2018.

FL5 (2022; based on eleventh generation Civic) 

The sixth-generation Civic Type R was introduced on July 20, 2022. Designated under the model code FL5, it is presently built in Yorii, Saitama, Japan, where the regular Civic liftback for the Japanese market is also built.

The FL5 Civic Type R is considered to be less aggressive in design compared to its predecessor with less prominent decorative vents and smaller air outlets. It uses a smaller 19-inch wheels compared to the previous generation which had 20-inch wheels, although the contact patch is wider due to the usage of Michelin Pilot Sport 4S tyres with 265/30-profile (previously 245/30). Equipped with widened fenders like its predecessor, the FL5 model in contrast gained widened rear doors and rear quarters instead of using a plastic add-on to achieve wider rear fenders.

In the interior, the model is equipped with semi-bucket seats, red carpeting and floor mats, and specific interface for the instrument panel screen and infotainment screen which included the Honda LogR data logger to store data such as lap times.

The 2.0-litre turbocharged petrol engine is carried over from the previous generation with incremental changes such as a revised turbocharger that features a more compact housing to improve the overall unit efficiency. The turbine itself has had both its blade count and shape optimised to boost power and improve airflow.

In March 2022, the pre-production model broke the Suzuka Circuit lap record for front-wheel-drive cars with a lap time of 2:23.120.

See also 
 Honda Type R
 Honda Civic Si

References

External links

 Honda U.S. Civic Type R
 Honda Japan Civic Type-R Honda Motor Co. site (Japanese)
 Honda Japan Civic Type-R Euro Honda Motor Co. site (Japanese)

Type R
Cars introduced in 1997
2000s cars
2010s cars
2020s cars
Sport compact cars
Sports sedans
Hot hatches
Front-wheel-drive sports cars